Kahurak may refer to:
 Kahurak, Khash